Rawi Bhavilai (also spelled Rawee Pawilai, 17 October 1925 – 17 March 2017) was a Thai astronomer, writer and translator. He served as a professor at the Physics Department of the Faculty of Science, Chulalongkorn University, and was known for his writings on astronomy as well as philosophy and religion. He was a fellow of the Royal Society of Thailand, and was named National Artist in literature in 2006. In 2018 he was honored with a Google Doodle.

References 

Rawi Bhavilai
Rawi Bhavilai
Rawi Bhavilai
Rawi Bhavilai
Rawi Bhavilai
Rawi Bhavilai
1925 births
2017 deaths